Sardi in Iran may refer to:
 Sardi, Ardabil (سردي - Sardī)
 Sardi, Rudbar-e Jonubi (سردي - Sardī), Kerman Province

See also
 Deh-e Sardi